(born Tokyo, 24 August 1962) is a former Japanese rugby union player who played as a fullback.

Career
After graduating from Keio University, Murai started playing for Marubeni in the All-Japan Rugby Company Championship. His first international cap for Japan was in a match against Ireland, at Osaka, on 26 May 1985. Murai was also part of the 1987 Rugby World Cup squad, where he played only the match against England, at Sydney, on 30 May 1987. In the same year, his last international cap was during a match against New Zealand, at Tokyo, on 1 November 1987, earning 8 caps for Japan.

Notes

External links
ESPN Scrum Profile

1962 births
Living people
Rugby union fullbacks
Japanese rugby union players
Japan international rugby union players
Keio University alumni
Sportspeople from Tokyo